Allen Farnham at Maybeck: Maybeck Recital Hall Series Volume Forty-One is an album of solo performances by jazz pianist Allen Farnham.

Music and recording
The album was recorded at the Maybeck Recital Hall in Berkeley, California in June 1994. The material includes standards and some improvised Farnham originals.

Release and reception

The AllMusic reviewer praised Farnham's emotional expression. The Penguin Guide to Jazz described the album as "A solid entry in the [Maybeck] series but hardly one of the essential ones."

Track listing
All tracks composed by Allen Farnham; except where indicated
"In Your Own Sweet Way" (Dave Brubeck)
"Waltz for Debby" (Bill Evans)
"The Carpal Tunnel Blues"
"Maybeck Sketch, No. 1"
"I Get a Kick Out of You" (Cole Porter)
"Never Let Me Go" (Jay Livingston, Ray Evans)
"Witch Hunt" (Wayne Shorter)
"Maybeck Sketch, No. 2"
"I Hear a Rhapsody" (Dick Gasparre, George Fragos, Jack Baker)
"Twilight World" (Marian McPartland)
"Lover" (Lorenz Hart, Richard Rodgers)

Personnel
Allen Farnham – piano
Technical
Bud Spangler, David Luke - engineer
James Gudeman - photography

References

1996 live albums
Albums recorded at the Maybeck Recital Hall
Solo piano jazz albums
albums produced by Carl Jefferson
Concord Records live albums